The East London Challenger, officially known as the South African Airways Open, was a tennis tournament held in East London, South Africa. It was played only in 2008, on outdoor hard courts.

Past finals

Singles

Detailed draw

Doubles

Detailed draw

See also
List of tennis tournaments

Tennis tournaments in South Africa
Hard court tennis tournaments
ATP Challenger Tour